The 1916 South Carolina Gamecocks football team represented the University of South Carolina during the 1916 Southern Intercollegiate Athletic Association football season. Led by W. Rice Warren in his first and only season as head coach, the Gamecocks compiled an overall record of 2–7 with a mark of 2–4 in SIAA play.

Schedule

References

South Carolina
South Carolina Gamecocks football seasons
South Carolina Gamecocks football